The enzyme FAD-AMP lyase (cyclizing) (EC 4.6.1.15) catalyzes the reaction 

FAD  AMP + riboflavin cyclic-4′,5′--phosphate

This enzyme belongs to the family of lyases, specifically the class of phosphorus-oxygen lyases.  The systematic name of this enzyme class is FAD AMP-lyase (riboflavin-cyclic-4′,5′-phosphate-forming). Other names in common use include FMN cyclase and FAD AMP-lyase (cyclic-FMN-forming).

References

Further reading 

 
 

EC 4.6.1
Enzymes of unknown structure